Erkand Mehdi Qerimaj (born 10 August 1988) is an Albanian weightlifter.

Competition results
At the 2008 European Championships he ranked 4th in the 77 kg category, with a total of 345 kg.

Qerimaj competed in Weightlifting at the 2008 Summer Olympics in the 77 kg division finishing thirteenth with 341 kg.

He is 5 ft 5 inches tall and weighs 170 lb.

In the 2012 European Weightlifting Championships that was held in Antalya, Turkey, Erkand Qerimaj competed in the 77 kg category. He won silver in Snatch, gold in Clean & Jerk and gold in total with 348 kg, ahead of Razvan Martin of Romania. Later on Erkand Qerimaj, resulted positive in the anti-doping test at the European Championship in Antalya and was disqualified.

In the 2014 European Weightlifting Championships that were held in Israel, Qerimaj won bronze in Snatch, gold in Clean & Jerk and gold in total with 349 kg. Silver medalist Daniel Godelli lifted the same total weight as Qerimaj, but with a slightly heavier body weight than Qerimaj took second place, leaving to Qerimaj the gold.

In the 2015 World Weightlifting Championships in Houston, Texas, Qerimaj competed in the 77 kg category. He lifted 154 kg in Snatch and 188 kg in Clean & Jerk for a total of 342 kg. He won 12th place overall.

He won the silver medal in the men's 73 kg Snatch event at the 2022 Mediterranean Games held in Oran, Algeria.

Personal life
Qerimaj is currently on a relationship with his fiancée Tedi Kalaja. He became a father for the first time on 22 January 2017 when his partner gave birth to the couple's first son, named Dijar. He stated that he named his son after the Albanian word "Dije" (English: Lore).

References
Instagram Profile

External links
 Instagram Profile
 
 
 
 
 

1988 births
Living people
Albanian male weightlifters
Albanian sportspeople in doping cases
Doping cases in weightlifting
Olympic weightlifters of Albania
Weightlifters at the 2008 Summer Olympics
Weightlifters at the 2020 Summer Olympics
European champions in weightlifting
European champions for Albania
European Weightlifting Championships medalists
Mediterranean Games medalists in weightlifting
Mediterranean Games gold medalists for Albania
Mediterranean Games silver medalists for Albania
Competitors at the 2009 Mediterranean Games
Competitors at the 2022 Mediterranean Games
21st-century Albanian people